The 2008 Helpmann Awards were presented on 28 July 2008 at the Lyric Theatre, Sydney. The ceremony was hosted by Jonathan Biggins and Julia Zemiro and was broadcast live on  Bio. (Foxtel's biography channel).

Nominees
(winners are bolded)

Theatre

Musicals

Opera and Classical Music

Dance and Physical Theatre

Contemporary Music

Other

Industry

References

External links
Helpmann Awards official site

Helpmann
Helpmann
Helpmann Awards
Helpmann Awards, 8th
Helpmann Awards